Thomas Armitage (1824–1890), a British physician, and founder of the Royal National Institute of Blind People.

Thomas Armitage or Thomas Armytage may also refer to:

Tom Armitage (1848–1922), English cricketer
Thomas Armitage (clergyman) (1819–1896), American clergyman
Thomas Armitage (cricketer) (1846–1923), New Zealand cricketer
Sir Thomas Armytage, 3rd Baronet (1652–1694) of the Armytage baronets
Sir Thomas Armytage, 6th Baronet (1673–1737)  of the Armytage baronets

See also
Armitage (surname)
Armytage